The Ralph Hardesty Stone House is a historic house located on Main Street in Norwich, Ohio.

Description and history
The house is a two-story stone building with a slate gable roof. The facade on the south has three bays with the door in the center bay. The native sandstone used in construction is dressed and shows numerous tooling marks. The west gable end of the building show evidence an addition might have been attached there. This is supported by early tax records describing a "stone and brick" house. The interior retains much of the original design with an open two run stairway off a central hall. The stairway has a plain railing and delicate square balusters. Original woodwork including window and door molding and chair rails is largely intact. Built in 1836 the house was placed on the National Register on March 11, 1980.

See also
 Glossary of architecture
 History of Ohio

References

External links
 * 

Houses on the National Register of Historic Places in Ohio
Houses completed in 1836
Houses in Muskingum County, Ohio
National Register of Historic Places in Muskingum County, Ohio
Stone houses in Ohio